Dexteria floridana is an extinct species of fairy shrimp in the family Chirocephalidae, the only species in the genus Dexteria. It was endemic to Florida, where it was known from a single pool, south of Gainesville. It was originally described by Ralph W. Dexter in 1953 as a species of Eubranchipus. The species was declared extinct on October 5, 2011 because it was found that the only known pool of water that contained the known population was filled in for development, thereby killing the shrimps.

References

Anostraca
Branchiopoda genera
Endemic fauna of Florida
Freshwater crustaceans of North America
Extinct animals of the United States
Monotypic arthropod genera
Crustaceans described in 1953
Extinct invertebrates since 1500
Extinct crustaceans
Taxonomy articles created by Polbot